Statistics of Scottish Football League in season 1976/1977.

Scottish Premier Division

Scottish First Division

Scottish Second Division

See also
1976–77 in Scottish football

References

 
Scottish Football League seasons